The Liaison Office of Kosovo in Belgrade is a representative mission of the Government of Kosovo in Belgrade, Serbia.

History
Serbia and Kosovo agreed to exchange liaison officers in 2013 under the terms of the Brussels Agreement which sought to aid the normalisation of relations between them. Under the terms of an EU proposed agreement that was accepted by both parties in March 2023, the liaison offices in each country are to be upgraded to Permeant Missions. Serbia also agreed to recognise Kosovo's national symbols and official documents.

Location
The liaison office is located at the premises of the European Union Delegation to Serbia, at Vladimira Popovica 40A, 11070, Belgrade, an office complex that also houses the Australian Embassy in Belgrade and a regional office of the European Investment Bank.

Representatives
The current Liaison Officer of Kosovo in Belgrade is Jetish Jashari.

List of Liaison Officers
Lulzim Peci (2013-????)
Jetish Jashari (????-Present)

See also

List of diplomatic missions of Kosovo
List of diplomatic missions in Serbia
Kosovo-Serbia relations

References

External links
Official website

Diplomatic missions of Kosovo